Bernd Dizon Schipmann (born July 5, 1994) is a professional footballer who plays as a goalkeeper for USL League One club Forward Madison.  Born in Germany, he represents the Philippines national team.

Club career

Youth
Schipmann had his youth career at SC Greven 09, Osnabrück, Eintracht Frankfurt and Schalke 04.

Schalke II
In 2013, Schipmann was promoted to Schalke 04 II, the reserve team of his club.

Holstein Kiel
In 2015, after his 2-season spell with the reserve team of Schalke 04, Schipmann joined 2. Bundesliga club Holstein Kiel on a free transfer.

Schipmann spent most of his time in Holstein Kiel in the reserve team.

Rot Weiss Ahlen
In 2018, after the expiry of his contract with his previous club, Schipmann joined Oberliga Westfalen club Rot Weiss Ahlen on a free transfer.

Ratchaburi
Schipmann signed with Thai League 1 club Ratchaburi F.C. for their 2021–22 season.

Forward Madison
Prior to their 2023 season, USL League One club Forward Madison FC announced the signing of Schipmann.

International career
Schipmann was born and raised in Münster, Germany to a German father and a Filipino mother, making him eligible to represent either Germany or Philippines at international level.

In June 2019, Schipmann initially was called up for the Philippines for a friendly against China. However he did not feature in that match.

In May 2021, Schipmann was once again called-up to the Philippines national team ahead of three 2022 FIFA World Cup qualification matches against China PR, Guam, and the Maldives. He made his debut on 7 June against China PR, where he collided with Wu Lei in the box as they both sprinted towards the through ball. Wu went on to score the penalty, and Philippines eventually lost the match 2–0. Four days later, Schipmann kept his first international clean sheet as they won 3–0 against Guam.

Personal life
Schipmann was born to a German father and Filipina mother who is a native of Pagadian, Zamboanga del Sur.

Honours

Club
Holstein Kiel
 Schleswig-Holstein Cup: 2017

References

External links

1994 births
Living people
Sportspeople from Münster
Citizens of the Philippines through descent
Association football goalkeepers
Filipino footballers
Philippines international footballers
German footballers
Filipino people of German descent
German sportspeople of Filipino descent
FC Schalke 04 II players
Holstein Kiel players
Holstein Kiel II players
Rot Weiss Ahlen players
Forward Madison FC players
Regionalliga players
USL League One players
Footballers from North Rhine-Westphalia
German expatriate sportspeople in the United States
Expatriate soccer players in the United States